Lawrence Walford is a British television producer and director.

Walford’s film Catching The Tax Dodgers was described by The Guardian as "a nuanced piece of storytelling, peppered with fascinating human anthropology, a surprising, fascinating piece of television, full of unexpected wonder."

His company FORM Films won the Royal Television Society Award for Best Factual Series for The Boats that Built Britain.

Filmography
The Commuters 1998
 Hitlers Third Reich 1998
Living In The Dead Zone, 1999 Editor
County Kilburn, 2000 Editor
The Ante, 2001
Fame Academy, 2002 Series Editor
Boat Yard, 2005 Executive Producer
Floating Kitchen, 2007 Executive Producer
The Real Pink Panther, 2008 Executive Producer 
Twitchers A Very British Obsession, 2010 Executive Producer
Boats that Built Britain, 2011 Series Director 
Reza Spice Prince of India, 2013 Executive Producer
The Restoration Man, 2014 Series Producer
Ross Kemp's Britain, 2015 Series Producer
Ill Gotten Gains, 2016 to 2020 Executive Producer
Catching The Tax Dodgers, 2017 Producer and Director
How To Start An Airline, 2018 Executive Producer
The Real Bling Ring : Hollywood Heist, 2022 Executive Producer
Hotel Custody, 2022 Executive Producer
Italia 90: When Football Changed Forever ,|2022 Executive Producer

References

External links

1972 births
Living people
Television people from London
English television directors